France Memorial United Presbyterian Church is a historic Presbyterian church at 3rd and Cedar Streets in the city of Rawlins, Wyoming.

The Gothic Revival building was constructed in 1882 and added to the National Register of Historic Places in 1984.

It is built of stone quarried from mountains north of the city.  Its  walls enclose a  space.  It has a three-tiered tower with the top tier made of wood.

References

External links

 France Memorial United Methodist Church at the Wyoming State Historic Prsevation Office

Churches on the National Register of Historic Places in Wyoming
Gothic Revival church buildings in Wyoming
Churches completed in 1882
Buildings and structures in Carbon County, Wyoming
Presbyterian churches in Wyoming
National Register of Historic Places in Carbon County, Wyoming
Rawlins, Wyoming